Just Don't Make a Scene, Mum! is a young adult novel by Rosie Rushton. It is the first book in her popular Leehampton series. It was first published in 1995 by Piccadilly Press.

Plot

Plot introduction 
Chelsea Gee is the fifteen-year-old daughter of famous reporter and agony aunt Ginny Gee. Her father is unemployed and loves to cook exotic food. Her brother, Warwick, is leaving to Indonesia to help save the trees and her sister, Geneva, studies in Chicago. Chelsea is ashamed of her mother, because she is overweight and lacks fashion sense.

Laura Turnbull's parents are divorced. Her dad lives with his girlfriend "Bestial" Betsy, and her kids Sonia and Daryl. Laura lives with her mum in a little house. Ruth's going out with Melvyn, who Laura hates. She thinks that her parents should live together.

Jemma Farrant's mother is very old-fashioned. She thinks her daughter should wear hand-knitted jumpers with little bears on it to school. Jemma is not allowed to have a boyfriend or wear make-up.

Jon Joseph has a talent for art, but his father wants him to study law at Cambridge. His mum is not surprised, because she likes painting too, but she cannot understand why her son wants to go to Lee Hill instead of Bellborough Court.

Sumitha Barenji's father thinks that his daughter should have long hair, no make-up and no boyfriend. Sumitha is unhappy and she wants her dad to change. Luckily, her mum is on daughter's side.

Plot summary 
Laura calls into Ginny Gee's agony aunt radio show under a false name and complains about her divorced parents and her mother's new boyfriend. Ginny recognises Laura's voice and feels uncomfortable, as she is friends with Laura's mother. Laura's father also hears the show, and wonders about his daughter's happiness.

Meanwhile, Jon argues with his father about his choice of career. Jon leaves on his bike, but accidentally collides with Laura. At first they argue, but they soon realise they are getting along well.

Sumitha's father forbids her to go to a party, but she goes to Laura's for a sleepover and they sneak out together. Chelsea dances with Rob, and Sumitha with Jon, which irritates Laura. After the party Laura and Sumitha argue about Jon.

Few weeks later, there is a parents' meeting at school. Then the holidays start and girls are going abroad with their parents (except Jemma, who is going to Paris with teachers and some students from Lee Hill). But before leaving Leehampton, parents organise a party at the Gees'.

Characters 
Chelsea Gee – Laura's best friend. Her mother is an agony aunt for teenagers and she writes articles for The Echo (a local newspaper). Chelsea is embarrassed by her mother, who, in her opinion, lacks fashion sense. Chelsea is very pretty and wants to be a vet.
Laura Turnbull – Chelsea's best friend. She's got red hair and green eyes. Laura wants to be a writer. She hates Melvyn and Betsy, because she wants her parents to live together. She is in love with Jon.
Jemma Farrant – A new girl in Lee Hill. She wears jumpers with bears to school, because her mother says so. She hates her clothes and finally her mum buys her "normal" clothes for teenagers. 
Sumitha Banerji – A girl from India. Her family comes from Kolkata in West Bengal district. Her father wants her to act like a traditional Indian girl, who can't have short hair, make-up or a boyfriend. 
Jonathan "Jon" Joseph – A talented student of Bellborough Court. He hates his school, because he likes drawing and painting (he's got talent for it) and in Bellborough Court he cannot study art. He wants to go to Lee Hill, where he can study art. He is in love with Sumitha.
Ginny Gee – Chelsea's mum. She is an agony aunt for teenagers and journalist for The Echo. 
Barry Gee – Chelsea's dad. He is unemployed. He likes to cook exotic food, which his daughter cannot eat.
Warwick Gee – Chelsea's brother. 
Ruth Turnbull – Laura's mum. She goes out with Melvyn. 
Peter Turnbull – Laura's dad. He lives with his girlfriend Betsy.
Claire Farrant – Jemma's mum. She is not ready for Jemma to grow up, dressing her daughter in jumpers with little bears and calling her "petal" in public.
Andrew Farrant – Jemma's dad. 
Chitrita Banerji – Sumitha's mum. She teaches English to women from India.
Rajiv Banerji – Sumitha's dad. 
Sandeep Banerji – Sumitha's little brother.
Anona Joseph – Jon's mum. She's owns a flower shop, but wants to study art.
Henry Joseph – Jon's dad. He wants Jon to study in Cambridge.
Melvyn McCrouch – Ruth Turnbull's partner.

British young adult novels
1995 British novels
Novels by Rosie Rushton